Benham-Lynch State Resort Park is a proposed state park in Harlan County, Kentucky, United States. Although it has not yet been established, current attractions within the proposed park include: The Kentucky Coal Mining Museum (Benham), the Benham Schoolhouse Inn (Benham), the train depot (Lynch), and the Portal 31 Mine (Lynch). The lack of state funds has hindered the development of the park.

References

External links
Portal 31 Mine
Kentucky Coal Mining Museum
Benham Schoolhouse Inn

Protected areas of Harlan County, Kentucky
State parks of Kentucky
Proposed protected areas